The enzyme benzoylformate decarboxylase catalyzes the following chemical reaction:

benzoylformate +  H+   benzaldehyde + CO2

Hence, this enzyme has one substrate, benzoylformate, and two products, benzaldehyde and CO2.

This enzyme belongs to the family of lyases, specifically the carboxy-lyases, which cleave carbon-carbon bonds.  The systematic name of this enzyme class is benzoylformate carboxy-lyase (benzaldehyde-forming). Other names in common use include phenylglyoxylate decarboxylase, and benzoylformate carboxy-lyase.  This enzyme participates in benzoate degradation via hydroxylation and toluene and xylene degradation.  It employs one cofactor, thiamin diphosphate.

Structural studies

References

 

EC 4.1.1
Thiamine enzymes
Enzymes of known structure